CPN Radio was a Peruvian radio broadcaster with national coverage in Peru. It was founded in 1996. Early in the decade of 2000 was the main competitor of RPP (Radio Programas del Perú), but declined at the end of the decade. Finally, because of economic problems radio ownership changed, but failed to get solvent. Following those circumstances was forced to stop broadcasting in 2011 and was replaced by a romantic music station.

See also
 
 Media of Peru

External links
Official website

Radio in Peru
Radio stations in Peru
Radio stations established in 1996
Radio stations disestablished in 2011
Defunct mass media in Peru